Kim Ha-yeon may refer to:
 Kim Ha-yeon (sport shooter)
 Kim Ha-yeon (actress)